KAAT may refer to:

 the ICAO code for Alturas Municipal Airport
 KAAT (FM), a radio station (103.1 FM) licensed to Oakhurst, California, United States
 Kaat (given name)
 Jim Kaat (born 1938), American baseball broadcaster and former player